Dillon River may refer to:

Dillon River (Canada)
Dillon River (New Zealand)